The Playhouse Theatre in central Perth, Western Australia was purpose-built for live theatre in the 1950s and remained one of the city's principal venues for performing arts for over half a century until replaced by the State Theatre Centre of Western Australia in January 2011. It was demolished in October 2012 as part of a redevelopment of Cathedral Square.

History

Founding
The theatre was constructed adjacent to St George's Cathedral on Pier Street land owned by the Anglican Church, the former site of the Church of England Deanery tennis court. The building was designed by the local architectural firm of Sheldon & Krantz and constructed at a cost of £65,000. The main lobby contained a mural by local brutalist architect Iwan Iwanoff.  The theatre was formally opened on 22 August 1956 to a capacity audience of 700, with the opening production of John Patrick’s 1953 Pulitzer Prize-winning play The Teahouse of the August Moon.
 
In 1919 the establishment of the Perth Repertory Club had led to the development of a strong local amateur-based theatre scene. The Repertory Club initially worked out of a basement room at the Palace Hotel and, later, the old composing room of the Western Australian Newspaper Company.  The need for the Playhouse arose as Perth's main theatre, His Majesty's Theatre was considered too large to provide a feasible venue for locally produced live-theatre productions, and had been functioning principally as a cinema since the early 1940s. In the mid-1950s the board and members of the Repertory Club commenced fundraising for the construction of a smaller purpose-built theatre to stage their productions. With the opening of the Playhouse, the Repertory Club became a fully professional theatre company, the National Theatre Company.

Actors and crew
Notable actor Edgar Metcalfe was a regular performer on stage and also served three terms as artistic director between 1963–1984. A rare period of box-office success was enjoyed by the theatre from 1978–1981 when Stephen Barry was artistic director of the National Theatre at the Playhouse. He arranged outstanding guest performances by international celebrities Warren Mitchell, Honor Blackman, Robyn Nevin, Timothy West, Tim Brooke-Taylor and Judy Davis, among others. Barry commissioned Dorothy Hewett's play, The Man from Muckinupin, for the State's sesquicentennial (150th) anniversary celebrations in 1979 (WAY '79), despite hostile resistance from then state premier Sir Charles Court. However, soon after Barry's departure, the company lost its audience appeal. Despite an extensive renovation in 1982, with reduction of seating capacity, the National Theatre was liquidated in February 1984. In 1984 the Playhouse was leased to the Perth Theatre Trust and the venue subsequently became home to The Playhouse Theatre Company (1984–85), Western Australian Theatre Company (1985–1991) and finally the Perth Theatre Company (1995–2009). The Playhouse was principally used for drama, contemporary dance and comedy performances.

Facilities
A traditional proscenium arch theatre with a raked auditorium, the Playhouse had bar and conference facilities, and hosted productions from the annual Perth International Arts Festival. It was the performance and administrative home of the Perth Theatre Company for sixteen years, until the company's relocation to the new State Theatre Centre of Western Australia in January 2011. The Company's last production was of David Williamson's The Removalists in April 2010.  Demolition was originally planned for 2010 but postponed when the Perth Theatre Trust sought to extend its lease due to delays to the construction of the State Theatre. The final production was the pantomime production of Puss in Boots in December 2010, produced by the MS Society of WA.

See also
Regal Theatre

References

Further reading
 
 Casey M Creating frames: contemporary indigenous theatre 1967-1990 Univ. of Queensland Press, 2004
 Sara Fitzpatrick  Playhouse Theatre, Perth Playhouse enjoys second coming at InMyCommunity, 21 June 2011

Theatres in Perth, Western Australia
Former theatres in Perth, Western Australia
Former buildings and structures in Perth, Western Australia
Theatres completed in 1956
WAY 79
1956 establishments in Australia
Cathedral Square, Perth
Buildings and structures demolished in 2012
Demolished buildings and structures in Western Australia